The 2014 Drentse 8 van Dwingeloo was the 8th running of the women's Drentse 8 van Dwingeloo, a women's bicycle race in the Netherlands. It was rated by the UCI as a 1.2 category race.

Results

References

External links
  

Ronde van Drenthe (women's race)
Drentse 8 van Dwingeloo
Drentse 8 van Dwingeloo